The European Journal of Psychology of Education: A Journal of Education and Development is a quarterly peer-reviewed academic journal covering educational psychology. It was established in 1986 and is published by Springer Science+Business Media. The editor-in-chief is Aleksandar Baucal (University of Belgrade). According to the Journal Citation Reports, the journal has a 2017 impact factor of 1.483.

References

External links

Publications established in 1986
Educational psychology journals
Springer Science+Business Media academic journals
Quarterly journals
English-language journals